Regiment Langenhoven was a motorised infantry regiment of the South African Army. It formed part of the South African Army Infantry Formation. As a reserve unit, it had a status roughly equivalent to that of a present-day British Army Reserve or United States Army National Guard unit.

History

Origin
Regiment South Western Districts was formed in 1934 and headquartered in Oudtshoorn. The regiment was initially tasked as a machine gun battalion. (This is represented in their cap badge, which shows two machine guns crossed behind a protea.)

World War Two
The regiment was not at full strength at the beginning of the Second World War, and subsequently the regiment was amalgamated with 11th and 12th Armoured Car Companies, forming the 5th Armoured Car Regiment.
5th Armoured Car Regiment then deployed to North Africa arriving at Port Tewfik in Egypt. The regiment did not play a further role in the fighting directly, as its personnel was allocated as reinforcement to depleted units from the fighting at Sid Rezegh.
The regiment did, however, volunteer for service with the 6th South African Armoured Division in Italy.

Re-mustering and name changes
The regiment converted to a motorised infantry battalion in October 1956 and underwent a name change to Regiment Langenhoven after Cornelis Jacobus Langenhoven, a South African poet.
Between 1960 and 1966 the regiment was, however, known as Regiment Outeniqua; this was short-lived, and by 1966 the regiment reverted to the name of Regiment Langenhoven.

Disbandment
The regiment appears to have been disbanded in 1997.

Unit insignia

SADF-era insignia

References

Infantry regiments of South Africa
Military units and formations established in 1934